This is a list of films produced in France in 1971.

See also
1971 in France

Notes

External links
 French films of 1971 at the Internet Movie Database
French films of 1971 at Cinema-francais.fr

1971
Films
Lists of 1971 films by country or language